Nimamar Rural LLG is a local government area in New Ireland Province, Papua New Guinea. The LLG administers the Lihir Group of islands. The LLG is located in Namatanai District and contains the Lihir Gold Mine, which is the second largest gold deposit in the world. Main language spoken here is the Lihir language. Many speakers of other languages are present here due to the mining on the island. Commonly are Niwer Mil language, Kuanua language and Mandara language.

The current LLG president is Ambrose Silul who is also the Deputy Governor of New Ireland. The total population of the LLG is 25,608 (Census 2011).

Wards
01. Londolovit
02. Puput
03. Matakues
04. Lataul
05. Komat
06. Pangoh
07. Hurtol
08. Samo
09. Lamboar
10. Kosmaium
11. Kuanie
12. Malie
13. Malal
14. Ton
15. Mahur
84. Londolovit Township

References

 Lihir at Ethnologue (18th ed., 2015)
Niwer Mil (Tangga Island) at Ethnologue (18th ed., 2015)
 Hammarström, Harald; Forkel, Robert; Haspelmath, Martin; Bank, Sebastian, eds. (2016). "Kuanua". Glottolog 2.7. Jena: Max Planck Institute for the Science of Human History.
 Mandara at Ethnologue (18th ed., 2015)

Local-level governments of New Ireland Province